Robert H. Davies (born 1876) was an English footballer who played as a left back. He made 65 Football League appearances and 60 Southern League appearances in the years before the First World War.

Career
Bob Davies played locally for Tonge Lower End, Haugh Albion and Halliwell Rovers. Davies joined Bolton Wanderers in July 1895 from Halliwell Rovers to play for four seasons in Division One but only in the final season as a regular for Bolton Wanderers. Davies moved south to play with Bedminster in the Southern League. When Bedminster merged with Bristol City in the summer of 1900, Davies stayed with the merged club. Davies played one season in the Southern League with Bristol City and then the following two seasons in Division Two as City were elected to the Football League.

Honours
with Bristol City
Southern Football League runner up: 1900–01

References

1876 births
Year of death missing
Footballers from Bolton
English footballers
Association football fullbacks
Bolton Wanderers F.C. players
Halliwell Rovers F.C. players
Bedminster F.C. players
Bristol City F.C. players
English Football League players
Southern Football League players
Western Football League players